Ambulatory blood pressure monitoring (ABPM) measures blood pressure at regular intervals. It is believed to be able to reduce the white coat hypertension effect in which a patient's blood pressure is elevated during the examination process due to nervousness and anxiety caused by being in a clinical setting. ABPM can also detect the reverse condition, masked hypertension, where the patient has normal blood pressure during the examination but uncontrolled blood pressure at home. Out-of-office measurements are highly recommended as an adjunct to office measurements by almost all hypertension organizations.

Blood pressure variability
24-hour, non-invasive ambulatory blood pressure (BP) monitoring allows estimates of cardiac risk factors including excessive BP variability or patterns of circadian variability known to increase risks of a cardiovascular event.

Nocturnal hypertension
Ambulatory blood pressure monitoring allows blood pressure to be intermittently monitored during sleep and is useful to determine whether the patient is a "dipper" or "non-dipper"—that is to say, whether or not blood pressure falls at night compared to daytime values. A night time fall is normal and desirable. It correlates with relationship depth but other factors such as sleep quality, age, hypertensive status, marital status, and social network support. Absence of a night time dip is associated with poorer health outcomes, including increased mortality in one recent study. In addition, nocturnal hypertension is associated with end organ damage and is a much better indicator than the daytime blood pressure reading.

Target organ damage

Readings revealing possible hypertension-related end organ damage, such as left ventricular hypertrophy or narrowing of the retinal arteries, are more likely to be gained through ambulatory blood pressure monitoring than through clinical blood pressure measurement.  Clinical BP measurements are fewer in number, and so more subject to the general marked variability of BP measurements.  Additionally, clinical measurements are affected by the "white coat effect" - the rise in blood pressure many patients experience due to the stress of being in the medical situation.

Overnight reduction or surge in blood pressure
Optimal blood pressure fluctuates over a 24-hour sleep-wake cycle, with values rising in the daytime and falling after midnight.  The reduction in early morning blood pressure compared with average daytime pressure is referred to as the night-time dip.   Ambulatory blood pressure monitoring may reveal a blunted or abolished overnight dip in blood pressure.  This is clinically useful information because non-dipping blood pressure is associated with a higher risk of left ventricle hypertrophy and cardiovascular mortality.  By comparing the early morning pressures with average daytime pressures, a ratio can be calculated which is of value in assessing relative risk.  Dipping patterns are classified by the percent of drop in pressure, and based on the resulting ratios a person may be clinically classified for treatment as a "non-dipper" (with a blood pressure drop of less than 10%), a "dipper", an "extreme dipper", or a "reverse dipper", as detailed in the chart below.  Additionally, ambulatory monitoring may reveal an excessive morning blood pressure surge; which is associated with increased risk of stroke in elderly people with high blood pressure.

Classification of dipping in blood pressure is based on the American Heart Association's calculation, using systolic blood pressure (SBP) as follows:

Dippers have significantly lower all-cause mortality than non-dippers or reverse dippers.  As a result, "... ambulatory blood pressure predicts mortality significantly better than clinic blood pressure."

References

External links
 Ambulatory blood pressure monitoring, Medical Journal of Australia

Blood pressure
Cardiovascular physiology
Mathematics in medicine
Pressure